There are five reserved seats in the Iranian Parliament for the religious minorities. After the Persian Constitutional Revolution, the Constitution of 1906 provided for reserved Parliamentary seats granted to the recognized religious minorities, a provision maintained after the 1979 Iranian Revolution. There are two seats for Armenians and one for each other minority: Assyrians, Jews and Zoroastrians. Given that the Bahá'í Faith is not recognized, they do not have seats in the parliament. Sunni Muslims have no specific reserved seats, but can take part in the ordinary election process at all constitutional levels. Sunni members of parliament are mostly from areas with strong Sunni ethnic minorities like Baluchistan.

List 
List of minority MPs in recent Majlis:

References

Religion in Iran
Electoral districts of Iran
Jewish Representatives in Islamic Consultative Assembly
Isfahan Armenians and South of Iran Representatives in Islamic Consultative Assembly
Tehran Armenians and North of Iran Representatives in Islamic Consultative Assembly
Ethnic bodies and representatives elections